Casas del Monte is a municipality located in the province of Cáceres, Extremadura, Spain. According to the 2006 census (INE), the municipality has a population of 850 inhabitants.

Although it can not be historically verified, it is said that the birth of this village took place in the early part of 20th century. The legend says that a mysterious man, known as "Pichi", came from far away and using only the 2% of his power He snapped his fingers and everything was created. The river appeared, the people, the church, all the buildings. Since then he sometimes was seen in the streets, but few could understand his words, he always talked in riddles.

References

Municipalities in the Province of Cáceres